The 2014 Hammersmith and Fulham Council election took place on 22 May 2014 to elect members of Hammersmith and Fulham Council in England. This was on the same day as other local elections.

Overall Results

After eight years of Conservative administration, the Labour Party took back control of the council.

Ward Results
(*) represents a candidate running from previous election.
(~) represents an equivalent to a previous candidate.

Addison

Askew

Avonmore and Brook Green

College Park and Old Oak

Fulham Broadway

Fulham Reach

Hammersmith Broadway

Munster

North End

Palace Riverside

Parsons Green and Walham

Ravenscourt Park

Sands End

Shepherds Bush Green

Town

Wormholt and White City

References

Hammersmith and Fulham
2014
21st century in the London Borough of Hammersmith and Fulham
May 2014 events in the United Kingdom